Lianne Hall (Brighton) is an English folk/electronic  singer. In the late nineties she was singer with punk band Witchknot. John Peel featured Hall in his Sounds of The Suburbs, Bradford, and five Peel sessions, and described her as "one of the great English voices".

Discography

Studio albums
Trouble (2001) 
Abandon Ship (2006)
Crossing Wires (2010)
The Caretaker (2017)
Energy Flashback (2022)

John Peel Sessions
30/04/2000 (Maida Vale 3)
14/10/2001 (Maida Vale 4)
20/12/2001 (Peel Acres)
Abandon Ship album 2006

Collaborations

Vocals on "For Silence" from the album The Ideal Condition by Paul Hartnoll.
Backing vocals on "Please" from the album The Ideal Condition by Paul Hartnoll.
A collaborative album with D_rradio, titled "Making Spaces]].
Backing vocals on "Please" from the album 8:58, a project by Paul Hartnoll.

Haunted House
Collaboration with Paul Hartnoll.

 "Brave The Woods" (2014)

References

External links
 Allmusic

Living people
Year of birth missing (living people)